Llandow Halt railway station served the village of Llandow in South Wales.

History
When the Vale of Glamorgan Railway opened in 1897, four of its five original stations served the principal settlements along the route. The fifth station, Southerndown Road acted as a feeder station for a number of smaller villages nearby. However, this arrangement was not entirely satisfactory, as there was a long stretch of line between this station and Llantwit Major which was left unserved  by trains. To an extent, this did not matter, because most settlements lay well to the south of the railway. The one exception was Llandow, which was located very near to  the line, but had very inadequate road access to the two nearest stations. As  a result, the Llandow Parish Council requested that the railway company erect a halt. The first request was in 1898, with another in 1901, but these were both refused. In 1905, with the introduction of steam railmotor services on the line, the Barry Railway Company agreed to erect halts at Llandow and Fontigary, but in the event, these were not built. A further request in 1908 was turned down. It was not until 1915 that the company accepted a fourth application and approved the building of Llandow Halt. It received provisional sanction from the Board of Trade on 20 April 1915 and opened on 1 May. It had cost £250 to build.

Description
Llandow Halt was a very basic affair. It had two wooden platforms, each 130 feet in length. Each platform had an open-fronted wooden shelter. The crossing was at ground level and was provided with an electric bell for safety. The bell was operated by treadles placed on both lines 250 feet along from the crossing. Additional signals in the existing signal box had been added. The inspection of the new facilities (which did not occur until 15 October 1915) was entirely satisfied with these arrangements.

Closure
The station closed in 1964 when passenger services along the line were withdrawn.

Notes

References
Chapman, Colin (1998) The Vale of Glamorgan Railway The Oakwood Press

Disused railway stations in the Vale of Glamorgan
Railway stations in Great Britain opened in 1915
Railway stations in Great Britain closed in 1964
Former Barry Railway stations
Beeching closures in Wales